Nightscapes: Tales of the Ominous and Magical is a collection of dark fantasy short stories by American writer  Darrell Schweitzer. It was first published in hardcover and trade paperback by Wildside Press in April 2000.

Summary
The collection consists of seventeen early works of the author, including one of his tales about the legendary madman Tom O'Bedlam. The pieces were originally published from 1973-1999 in various speculative fiction magazines and anthologies.

Contents
 "A Servant of Satan" (from Interzone no. 136, Oct. 1998)
 "Adam" (from Cemetery Dance no. 24, Sum. 1996)
 "The Liar's Mouth" (from Cemetery Dance no. 16, Sum. 1993)
 "The Voice of Bel-Hemad" (from Fantasy Book v. 5, no. 3, Sep. 1986)
 "Bitter Chivalry" (from Realms of Fantasy v. 5, no. 3, Feb. 1999)
 "Caliban's Revenge" (from Weirdbook no. 13, May 1978)
 "In the Evening of Dreams" (from Weirdbook no. 6, Jan. 1973)
 "The Witch of the World's End" (from 100 Wicked Little Witch Stories, 1995)
 "On the Holy Mountain" (from Marion Zimmer Bradley's Fantasy Magazine no. 25, Fall 1994)
 "Smart Guy" (from Dante's Disciples, Feb. 1996)
 "Return from Exile" (from Terra Incognita no. 3, Sum. 1998)
 "Kvetchula" (from Marion Zimmer Bradley's Fantasy Magazine no. 36, Sum. 1997)
 "The Silence in Kandretiphon" (from Adventures in Sword & Sorcery no. 3, 1996)
 "Running to Camelot" (from Marion Zimmer Bradley's Fantasy Magazine no. 40, Sum. 1998)
 "Told by Moonlight" (from The Camelot Chronicles, Aug. 1992)
 "The Epilogue of the Sword" (from Excalibur, May 1995)
 "Time Enough for Lunacy" (from Weirdbook no. 25, Aut. 1990)

Reception
The collection was reviewed by Chris Gilmore in Interzone no. 160, October 2000, Paul Di Filippo in Asimov's Science Fiction, February 2001, and Nick Gevers in Nova Express, Spring/Summer 2001.

References

2000 short story collections
Short story collections by Darrell Schweitzer
Fantasy short story collections
Wildside Press books